Dragon Pathumwan Kanchanaburi Football Club (Thai สโมสรฟุตบอลดราก้อน ปทุมวัน กาญจนบุรี) is a Thai professional football club based in Mueang, Kanchanaburi, Thailand. The club is currently playing in the Thai League 3 Western region.

History
In 2017, the club was established as Singha Golden Bells Muangkan.

In 2018, the club has competed in Thailand Amateur League Western region, using Kanchanaburi municipality stadium as the ground. They competed in the amateur league to the 2018 and 2019 seasons continuously.

In 2020, the club was promoted to Thai League 3 or also known as Omsin League and renamed to Singha Golden Bells Kanchanaburi. Due to the resurgence of COVID-19 pandemic in Thailand, the FA Thailand must abruptly end the regional stage of the Thai League 3. The club finished the 4th place of the Western region.

In 2021, the club has changed the club's logo by using Leo's head and text KANCHANABURI FOOTBALL CLUB to compete in the Thai League 3 continuously.

In 2022, the club has renamed Dragon Pathumwan Kanchanaburi and changed the club's logo to be a dragon.

Stadium and locations

Season by season record

P = Played
W = Games won
D = Games drawn
L = Games lost
F = Goals for
A = Goals against
Pts = Points
Pos = Final position

QR1 = First Qualifying Round
QR2 = Second Qualifying Round
R1 = Round 1
R2 = Round 2
R3 = Round 3
R4 = Round 4

R5 = Round 5
R6 = Round 6
QF = Quarter-finals
SF = Semi-finals
RU = Runners-up
W = Winners

Honours

Domestic leagues
 Thai League 3 Western Region
 Winners (1): 2022–23

Players

Current squad

Club staff

References

Association football clubs established in 2017
Football clubs in Thailand
Kanchanaburi province
2017 establishments in Thailand